Dover may refer to the following places in the U.S. state of Michigan:

 Dover, Cass County, Michigan, a former post office in Milton Township
 Dover, Clare County, Michigan, an unincorporated community in Grant Township
 Dover, Lenawee County, Michigan, a former post office in Dover Township
 Dover, Washtenaw County, Michigan, an unincorporated community in Dexter Township

See also
 Mount Morris, Michigan, initially platted in 1862 with the name Dover
 Dover Township, Lake County, Michigan
 Dover Township, Lenawee County, Michigan
 Dover Township, Otsego County, Michigan